Piecepack is a public-domain game system that can be used to play a wide variety of board games, much as a standard deck of cards can be used to play thousands of card games ("A game system is a set of components that function together in multiple games"). Piecepack has been used by dozens of different game designers to create over 225 different board games and is available from many different manufacturers. It was created by James Kyle in 2001.

The system consists of 24 tiles, 24 coins, 4 pawns, and 4 dice. The Mystique Deck has been designed to use the same 4 suits (Suns, Moons, Arms, and Crowns), for compatibility with the Piecepack system. The pieces are sometimes used in conjunction with other components, including dominoes or playing cards.

The book The Infinite Board Game: Introducing the Amazing Piecepack System, published by Workman Publishing Company in 2015, details 50 of the games and includes a piecepack set with it, although the set included deviates from the published specification in the location of the suit markers.  This deviation renders certain piecepack games (for example, Alien City) unplayable with the Infinite Boardgame piecepack.  The piecepack is one of the base game systems included in Tabletop Simulator and is also available as a module for the Vassal Engine.

The system has been used for prototyping other games, including the prototyping of video games.

References

External links
Official piecepack site
Piecepack Wiki

Board games
Products introduced in 2001